Journey to Midnight is a 1971 British made-for-television horror film featuring two episodes derived from the 1968–1969 anthology television series Journey to the Unknown starring Chad Everett and Julie Harris, directed by Roy Ward Baker and Alan Gibson. The film contains the following episodes:

"The Indian Spirit Guide" (original broadcast: October 10, 1968 on ABC)
"Poor Butterfly" (original broadcast: January 9, 1969 on ABC)

Sebastian Cabot is featured as host who introduces the two episodes. Joan Crawford was also due to appear as co-host, but her scenes were ultimately cut. Her segments appeared in the 1970 television film Journey to the Unknown.

Plot

"Poor Butterfly"
Directed by Alan Gibson, the first segment features Chad Everett as a man who receives an invitation to a costume party and has no idea why he got the invitation. When he arrives at the party, everyone is dressed like it's the 1920s and they act like it is too. Based on a story by William Abney.

Cast
Chad Everett as Steven Miller
Bernard Lee as Ben Loker
Fay Compton as Queen Victoria

"The Indian Spirit Guide"
Directed by Roy Ward Baker, the second segment features Julie Harris as a wealthy widow who hires a private investigator to protect her from the phony spiritualists she encounters as she seeks out a real one to contact her late husband. Based on a story by Robert Bloch.

Cast
Julie Harris as Leona Gillings
Tom Adams as Jerry Crown
Tracy Reed as Joyce

References

External links

1971 television films
1971 films
1971 horror films
British horror television films
British anthology films
1970s English-language films
Hammer Film Productions films
Films edited from television programs
Films directed by Alan Gibson
Films directed by Roy Ward Baker
Films based on works by Robert Bloch